The 2013 World Table Tennis Championships women's doubles was the 51st edition of the women's doubles championship.

Guo Yue and Li Xiaoxia are the defending champions.
Guo Yue and Li Xiaoxia defeated Ding Ning and Liu Shiwen 5–11, 11–5, 11–7, 11–5, 11–7 in the final to win the title.

Seeds
Doubles matches will be best of 5 games in qualification matches and best of 7 games in the 64-player sized main draw.

  Guo Yue /  Li Xiaoxia (champions)
  Ding Ning /  Liu Shiwen (finals)
  Chen Meng /  Zhu Yuling (semifinals)
  Feng Tianwei /  Yu Mengyu (semifinals)
  Jiang Huajun /  Lee Ho Ching (quarterfinals)
  Hiroko Fujii /  Misako Wakamiya (quarterfinals)
  Park Young-Sook /  Yang Ha-Eun (quarterfinals)
  Kim Hye-Song /  Kim Jong (third round)
  Kasumi Ishikawa /  Misaki Morizono (third round)
  Cheng I-ching /  Huang Yi-hua (third round)
  Daniela Dodean /  Elizabeta Samara (second round)
  Georgina Póta /  Krisztina Tóth (third round)
  Ai Fukuhara /  Sayaka Hirano (quarterfinals)
  Kristin Silbereisen /  Wu Jiaduo (third round)
  Ri Mi-Gyong /  Ri Myong-Sun (third round)
  Petrissa Solja /  Sabine Winter (second round)
  Katarzyna Grzybowska /  Natalia Partyka (third round)
  Dana Čechová /  Renata Štrbiková (second round)
  Galia Dvorak /  Sara Ramírez (first round)
  Katerina Pěnkavová /  Iveta Vacenovská (second round)
  Zhenqi Barthel /  Irene Ivancan (second round)
  Park Seong-Hye /  Seok Ha-Jung (second round)
  Tetyana Bilenko /  Ganna Gaponova (second round)
  Petra Lovas /  Szandra Pergel (second round)
  Alina Arlouskaya /  Viktoria Pavlovich (second round)
  Guan Mengyuan /  Ng Wing Nam (third round)
  Doo Hoi Kem /  Li Ching Wan (first round)
  Ariel Hsing /  Lily Zhang (first round)
  Laura Gasnier /  Xian Yi Fang (second round)
  Camelia Postoaca /  Bernadette Szőcs (second round)
  Chen Szu-yu /  Liu Hsing-yin (second round)
  Alice Abbat /  Carole Grundisch (second round)

Draw

Finals

Top half

Section 1

Section 2

Bottom half

Section 3

Section 4

See also
List of World Table Tennis Championships medalists

References

External links
Main Draw

Women's doubles
World